Whiteland is a town in Pleasant, Franklin and Clark townships, Johnson County, Indiana, United States. The population was 4,599 at the 2020 census.

Major access roads to get to Whiteland are I-65 (exit 95 is the Whiteland exit), south on U.S. 31 from Indianapolis and north from Columbus.

History
Whiteland was platted in 1863 by Joel B. White and others.

Geography
Whiteland is located at  (39.549336, -86.086100).

Climate
The climate in this area is characterized by hot, humid summers and generally mild to cool winters.  According to the Köppen Climate Classification system, Whiteland has a humid subtropical climate, abbreviated "Cfa" on climate maps.

Demographics

2010 census
As of the census of 2010, there were 4,169 people, 1,468 households, and 1,163 families living in the town. The racial makeup of the town was 97.0% White, 0.4% African American, 0.2% Native American, 0.7% Asian, 0.1% Pacific Islander, 0.6% from other races, and 1.1% from two or more races. Hispanic or Latino of any race were 1.8% of the population.

There were 1,468 households, of which 41.4% had children under the age of 18 living with them, 64.2% were married couples living together, 9.5% had a female householder with no husband present, 5.6% had a male householder with no wife present, and 20.8% were non-families. 15.6% of all households were made up of individuals, and 4.8% had someone living alone who was 65 years of age or older. The average household size was 2.84 and the average family size was 3.15.

The median age in the town was 37.3 years. 27.6% of residents were under the age of 18; 8.2% were between the ages of 18 and 24; 27.1% were from 25 to 44; 28.5% were from 45 to 64; and 8.5% were 65 years of age or older. The gender makeup of the town was 49.1% male and 50.9% female.

2000 census
As of the census of 2000, there were 3,958 people, 1,355 households, and 1,116 families living in the town. The racial makeup of the town was 98.46% White, 0.05% African American, 0.10% Native American, 0.35% Asian, 0.56% from other races, and 0.48% from two or more races. Hispanic or Latino of any race were 1.09% of the population.

There were 1,355 households, out of which 47.8% had children under the age of 18 living with them, 70.6% were married couples living together, 9.3% had a female householder with no husband present, and 17.6% were non-families. 13.6% of all households were made up of individuals, and 4.6% had someone living alone who was 65 years of age or older. The average household size was 2.92 and the average family size was 3.23.

In the town, the population was spread out, with 32.2% under the age of 18, 6.2% from 18 to 24, 36.5% from 25 to 44, 18.4% from 45 to 64, and 6.7% who were 65 years of age or older. The median age was 33 years. For every 100 females, there were 98.6 males. For every 100 females age 18 and over, there were 95.1 males.

The median income for a household in the town was $56,944, and the median income for a family was $61,810. Males had a median income of $42,247 versus $29,005 for females. The per capita income for the town was $21,169. About 1.0% of families and 1.9% of the population were below the poverty line, including 2.6% of those under age 18 and none of those age 65 or over.

Education
Formal education began when the first schoolhouse was built in 1869 and served as the town's school until the 1950s. In 1957, a new high school was built. The Class of 1958 was the first class to graduate from the new Whiteland High School. In 1965, Clark High School and Whiteland High School united to form Clark-Pleasant Community School Corporation and what is now known as Whiteland Community High School. The old Clark High School became Clark Elementary School and additional schools Break-O-Day Elementary School and Whiteland Elementary School were built between the 1960s and '70s.  In 1971 the Clark-Pleasant Middle school opened housing 6th, 7th and 8th grades.  That building is now used as the Math and Science building for the High School.  Clark-Pleasant Intermediate School was added to the district as of 2004 but it is now known to be Grassy Creek Elementary. Pleasant Crossing Elementary School, completed in the winter of 2007. Then the Clark-Pleasant Middle School was finished in 2011 and is known as one of the largest middle schools in the state. Ray Crowe Elementry opened in 2021 and is on the same Campus as Clark Pleasant Middle School and Grassy Creek Elementary School

Notable people

George Crowe, professional baseball player, Indiana Mr. Basketball 
Guilford M. Wiley, politician
Bob Glidden, professional Drag Racer
 Ray Crowe, Member of the Indiana House of Representatives, Indiana Basketball Hall of Fame, Hall of Fame of the University of Indianapolis,

References

External links
Town of Whiteland, Indiana website.
Clark-Pleasant Community School Corporation's Website
 Whiteland Police Department Website

Towns in Johnson County, Indiana
Towns in Indiana
Indianapolis metropolitan area